Kayyngdy is a village in the Kemin District of Chüy Region of Kyrgyzstan. Its population was 1,935 in 2021. The village is located on the left bank of the river Chong-Kemin.

References

Populated places in Chüy Region